Brazil Red is a 2001 French historical novel by Jean-Christophe Rufin which recounts the unsuccessful French attempt to conquer Brazil in the 16th century, against a background of wars of religion and a rite-of-passage discovery of the charms and secrets of the Amerindian world.

Plot
The plot of this veritable epic is set in 1555, on a small island in the Guanabara Bay of Rio de Janeiro, where an odd French expeditionary force, made up of sailors, craftsmen, priests, ex-convicts and a Quixotic knight, has just landed. Their objective is twofold: on the one hand, to set up a French colony on this far-off rich continent to compete with the Portuguese, on the other hand, to convert the Indians to Christianity. Ill-prepared for the realities of the New World and, above all, torn apart by theological controversy which sets the Catholics and Calvinists among them against one another, these French pioneers see their dreams of colonization gradually dissipate. Both satirical and colourful, Rouge Brésil is above all a passionate and exciting exploration of the origins of imperialist thinking.

See also
 2001 in literature
 Contemporary French literature

Novels set in the 1550s
2001 French novels
Historical novels
Novels set in Brazil
Prix Goncourt winning works